The 1871 Ontario general election was the second general election held in the Province of Ontario, Canada.  It was held on March 21, 1871, to elect the 82 Members of the 2nd Legislative Assembly of Ontario ("MLAs").

The Ontario Liberal Party, led by Edward Blake, won a slim majority of the seats, and formed the government.

The Ontario Conservative Party, led by John Sandfield Macdonald, served as the official opposition.

Results

See also
Politics of Ontario
List of Ontario political parties
Premier of Ontario
Leader of the Opposition (Ontario)

References

1871
1871 elections in Canada
March 1871 events
1871 in Ontario